Gymnocerus scabripennis is a species of beetle in the family Cerambycidae, and the only species in the genus Gymnocerus. It was described by Audinet-Serville in 1835.

References

Anisocerini
Beetles described in 1835
Monotypic Cerambycidae genera